Littleworth is a medium-sized village on the outskirts of Worcester. The village is the location of Nortan Juxta Kempsey Primary School and the Norton Parish Hall, it is about 5 miles southeast of Worcester. There is currently only one bus service going through the village.

References

Villages in Worcestershire